101st Regiment may refer to:

Infantry regiments
 101st Regiment of Foot (disambiguation), several units of the British Army
 101st Grenadiers, a unit of the army of British India
 101st (Northumbrian) Regiment Royal Artillery, a unit of the British Army 

 101st Infantry Regiment (United States)
 101st Regiment "Edmonton Fusiliers", a unit of Canada's Non-Permanent Active Militia from 1908 to 1920

Armoured regiments
 101 Panzer Regiment, a unit of the Führer Grenadier Brigade of the German Army

Aviation regiments
 101st Fighter-Training Aviation Regiment, a unit of the Yugoslav Air Force

Cavalry regiments
 101st Cavalry Regiment, a unit of the New York Army National Guard, United States Army

Artillery regiments
 101st Field Artillery Regiment, a unit of the United States Army

American Civil War regiments
 101st Indiana Infantry Regiment, a unit of the Union (North) Army
 101st Illinois Volunteer Infantry Regiment, a unit of the Union (North) Army

See also
 101st Division (disambiguation)
 101st Brigade (disambiguation)
 101st Squadron (disambiguation)
 101st Battalion (disambiguation)